Julian Stevenson is a Lisburn-born former Irish international hockey player. He attended Friends School Lisburn, and later played for Lisnagarvey Hockey Club while attaining many Ireland and Ulster caps. He has coached at Armagh Hockey Club, and currently at Cliftonville.

References

Male field hockey players from Northern Ireland
Irish male field hockey players
British male field hockey players
Belfast Harlequins field hockey players
Living people
Ireland international men's field hockey players
Lisnagarvey Hockey Club players
Irish field hockey coaches
Year of birth missing (living people)
Sportspeople from Lisburn